Jan Łączny (born 19 December 1950 in Dobrzyca) is a Polish politician. He was elected to Sejm on 25 September 2005, getting 2229 votes in 40 Koszalin district as a candidate from the Samoobrona Rzeczpospolitej Polskiej list.

He was also a member of Sejm 2001-2005.

See also
Members of Polish Sejm 2005-2007

External links
Jan Łączny - parliamentary page - includes declarations of interest, voting record, and transcripts of speeches.

Members of the Polish Sejm 2005–2007
Members of the Polish Sejm 2001–2005
Self-Defence of the Republic of Poland politicians
1950 births
Living people